Sturmia convergens is a species of fly in the family Tachinidae.

It is a parasitoid of the monarch butterfly (Danaus plexippus), as well as Danaus chrysippus and Agrius convolvuli. The wasp species Taeniogonalos raymenti can be reared as a hyperparasite of S. convergens.

References 

Exoristinae
Parasitic flies
Parasites of insects
Insects described in 1824